is a peak in the Hida Mountains range of the Japanese Alps, located in Nagano Prefecture and Toyama Prefecture, central Honshu, Japan.

Geography
Mount Shirouma is the  26th-tallest mountain in Japan. At , it is the highest peak in the Hakuba section of the Hida Mountains, and one of the top "to climb" peaks for Japanese hikers.

It is located within the Chūbu-Sangaku National Park. Mount Shirouma is one of the landmark 100 Famous Japanese Mountains. 

Alpine plants are also abundant on Shirouma in the summer.

Hiking
There are several popular hiking routes, including the Shirouma Dai Sekkei. This route begins at the Sarukura Lodge (猿倉荘) (1,250m) in the village of Hakuba, and takes approximately 6 hours to reach the summit. Another popular route is via Tsugaike Panorama Way, Hakuba Ooike, and Mount Korenge (2,766m). 

There are two lodges near the summit, Hakuba Lodge (白馬山荘) (2,832m) and Hakuba Kousha (2,730m), and tenting is possible at latter. There is also a lodge at Hakuba Oike.

Gallery

References

See also 
 Chūbu-Sangaku National Park
 Hida Mountains
 List of mountains in Japan
 100 Famous Japanese Mountains

Hida Mountains
Mount Shirouma
Mountains of Nagano Prefecture
Mountains of Toyama Prefecture